The CN08 is a 120 mm 55-caliber smoothbore gun produced by Hyundai WIA. It is incorrectly known as the licensed production of the Rheinmetall Rh-120 L/55, but it was indigenously developed by the Agency for Defense Development and WIA (now Hyundai WIA) from 2003 to 2008 for the XK2 development project started in 1995. The development was completed after the operational test ended in September 2008.

Description
The CN08 is the main armament of the K2 Black Panther, and the gun barrel is applied with internal chrome plating technology for the large-caliber gun. The gun barrel can endure a high explosive force as a result of the increased stiffness and wear resistance provided by this internal chromium surface. The main components, including the breech ring, breech block and thermal sleeve, are simplified and designed lightly, the gun barrel weighs 1324 kg and the gun mount weighs 3103 kg.

The gun mount consists of a hydro-pneumatic recoil system and is complemented by a bustle type autoloader powered by a main gun controller combined with a breech opening motor that automatically opens and closes the gun tube, it can fire up to 10 rounds a minute.

In addition, the top of the thermal sleeve of the gun barrel is mounted with a Dynamic Muzzle Reference System (DMRS). This dynamic muzzle reference system allows the tank gun to accurately hit the target even when the tank is maneuvering on irregular terrain.

Ammunition 

CN08's 120 mm round is produced in Poongsan Corporation, a South Korean ammunition manufacturer, and can fire 120×570 mm NATO tank ammunition.

Export

Turkey

On July 29 2008, Hyundai Rotem and Otokar signed a contract for technology transfer and design assistance for the Altay Tank Development Project. This contract includes technology transfer and design assistance for systems, armor package, and 120 mm guns required for Altay tank development.

Poland

On July 27, 2022, Polish Armaments Group (PGZ) and Hyundai Rotem signed a framework agreement to supply 180 K2s and 820 K2PLs. The agreement will include rapid arms supply and extensive technology transfer from South Korea, and 180 K2s will be produced in South Korea and delivered to Poland from 2022, and 820 K2PLs will be produced in Poland under license from 2026.

Variants
 MKE 120 mm tank gun: Turkish 120 mm 55 caliber smoothbore gun modified based on CN08 for the Altay tank. The design of the tank gun is the same as CN08, but there are two differences: unlike CN08, thermal sleeve is equipped with Static Muzzle Reference System (SMRS), and Altay's turret does not have breech opening motor and automatic feeding magazine system for autoloader mechanism, so ammunition can only be loaded manually by tank crew and can fire up to 6 rounds a minute.

Operators

Current operators 
  – Polish Land Forces
  – Republic of Korea Army

See also
 MKE 120 mm gun: Turkish 120 mm 55-caliber smoothbore gun developed for the Altay main battle tank.

Weapons of comparable role, performance and era
 L11A5 120 mm rifled gun: British rifled equivalent, developed by Royal Armament Research and Development Established (RARDE) in 1957.
 2A46 125 mm gun: Russian 125-mm equivalent, developed by Spetstekhnika Design Bureau in 1960s.
 Rheinmetall 120 mm gun: German equivalent, developed by Rheinmetall in 1974.
 CN120-25 120 mm gun: French equivalent, developed by Établissement d'Études et de Fabrication d'Armements de Bourges (EFAB) in 1979.
 EXP-28M1 120 mm rifled gun: Experimental British weapon of the late 1970s/early 1980s. Was to have equipped the MBT-80.
 CN120-26 120 mm gun: French equivalent, developed by EFAB in 1980s.
 IMI 120 mm gun: Israeli equivalent, developed by Israeli Military Industries in 1988.
 OTO Breda 120 mm gun: Italian equivalent, developed by OTO Melara in 1988.
 L30A1 120 mm rifled gun: British rifled equivalent, developed by ROF Nottingham in 1989.
 JSW 120 mm gun: Japanese equivalent, developed by Japan Steel Works in 2008.
 2A82-1M 125 mm gun: New Russian 125-mm equivalent, developed by Uralvagonzavod in 2014.

Notes

References

120 mm artillery
Tank guns
Tank guns of South Korea
Military equipment introduced in the 2000s